GB City is the debut studio album by Bass Drum of Death. It was released on Fat Possum Records on April 12, 2011. The video for "Get Found" was released in 2011. A single For "High School Roaches," featuring the title song "Get Found," "You're Haunting Me," and "Spare Room" was released on Baby Don't Records in 2010.

Track listing

† Cover of The Chiffons' pop/ doo-wop song He's So Fine

References

External links
 http://www.allmusic.com/album/gb-city-mw0002117228
 https://www.avclub.com/bass-drum-of-death-gb-city-1798167948

2011 debut albums
Bass Drum of Death albums
Fat Possum Records albums